The 1994 Nuveen Championships was an Association of Tennis Professionals men's tennis tournament played on outdoor hard courts in Scottsdale, Arizona in the United States that was part of the World Series of the 1994 ATP Tour. It was the seventh edition of the tournament and was held from February 21 through February 28, 1994. Fifth-seeded Andre Agassi, who entered on a wildcard, won his second consecutive singles title at the event and earned $42,000 first-prize money.

Finals

Singles

 Andre Agassi defeated  Luiz Mattar 6–4, 6–3
 It was Agassi's 1st title of the year and the 21st of his career.

Doubles

 Jan Apell /  Ken Flach defeated  Alex O'Brien /  Sandon Stolle 6–0, 6–4
 It was Apell's 1st title of the year and the 2nd of his career. It was Flach's only title of the year and the 34th of his career.

References

External links 
 ITF tournament edition details

Nuveen Championships
Nuveen Championships, 1994
Tennis Channel Open
Nuveen Championships
Nuveen Championships
Nuveen Championships